Sde Ilan is a religious moshav in northern Israel. Located to the west of Tiberias, it falls under the jurisdiction of Lower Galilee Regional Council.

History
The moshav was founded in 1949 with the assistance of Hapoel HaMizrachi and the Jewish Agency for Israel. Its name originates from the fifth tractate of the Mishnah.

References

Moshavim
Populated places in Northern District (Israel)
1949 establishments in Israel
Populated places established in 1949